Darreh Shahr Ancient City, also known as Madaktu and Seymareh, is the name of a  ruined area next to the existing city of Darreh Shahr in southwest Iran, in Ilam Province. The ruins belong to an ancient city of the late Sassanid era (224 – 651 AD) and is believed to be built on remnants of the Elamite capital, Madaktu. Historic texts and also recent findings reveal the fact that the city included about 5,000 houses with some modern aspects like water distribution system through clay pipes and underground sewers. The city was destroyed and deserted after a huge earthquake around 950 AD.

Ancient history
In ancient times, Elamites governed the Lorestan mountains and constructed several strong buildings. Darreh-Shahr was the first Elamite city attacked and destroyed by Assyrians, in addition to the massacre of people. In Seymareh Valley, the remains of Sassanid monuments are still present. Hence Dareh-Shahr might have been a thriving city in the Sassanid and Parthian eras. 
Furthermore, foreign experts call the unearthed city as the second and lost capital of the Soloukis while some Iranian archeologists believe the monuments are part of the state of Shirvan.
 
Some resources and texts link Dareh-Shahr to Mehr Jaan Ghazagh, Saabzaan, Seymareh or the city of Khosrow Parviz in the late Sassanid period, which was completely flattened by earthquakes in 248 and 344 AH.
 
In the ruins of Dareh-Shahr, which belong to the Sassanid era, there are the vestiges of crosses, arches, ceilings, dome-shaped ceilings, alleys and passages with urban development criteria of that time.
 
All the buildings of Dareh-Shahr are built from abraded stones and gypsum. Abundance of gypsum in Seymareh Valley and simplicity of working with it have led to their use in the Sassanid architecture.
 
Coins discovered in this area belong to the rule of Khosrow III and his successors. 
Located in the south of Dareh-Shahr, at the beginning of a gorge of the same name on the outskirts of Kabir Kuh, is an ancient bridge called Gavmishan with 3 arches that were repaired in 2008.

Discoveries
Archeological excavations of the 1990s in Dareh-Shahr revealed a significant number of stucco surfaces and pieces which, in terms of diversity, finesse and aesthetics, are unique and unparalleled.
 
The stucco patterns in this region are diverse and bear detailed decorations. The shapes are geometric with plant motifs. The stucco works are in geometrical shapes (triangular, round, square and rectangular) and the surfaces are solid. 
All the pieces have backgrounds and margins. The marginal shapes are in the form of Greek chains, rope-like texture and consecutive sevens, upside-down patterns and consecutive ‘S’ shapes.
 
Patterns in the center include lilies and 6- or 8-leaf flowers with a central circle, pomegranate, palm leaf and clusters combined in a beautiful composition. 
This image reveals the imaginative power of artists who, given the quality and flexibility of stucco, were able to create them because of the lack of stucco firmness.
 
In 2000, 50-day operations were launched by a team of archeologists. Excavations were aimed at shedding light on the unknown features and historical background of the ancient area.
 
Unearthed remains of a city structure, including residential quarters, passages, stables, market place, public bath and modern sewage system, have attracted the attention of Iranian and foreign archeologists in recent years.
 
In 2006, eleven rare objects dating back to 2800 BC were illegally unearthed from Dareh-Shahr. These included metal items such as arrows with designs, metals depicting wild goats, a golden cup and a unique and precious silver mask, which is estimated to be from the first millennium BC. 
Fortunately, this collection was seized in Tehran from an illegal digger in April of that year and was transferred to the Cultural Heritage Police Department. 
In 2007, the continuation of agricultural activities in the vicinity of the national heritage site of Dareh-Shahr threatened this historical city.

Heritage listing
According to Behzad Faryadian, the head of Seymareh Cultural Heritage Department, Dareh-Shahr was registered as the tenth cultural heritage site on the National Heritage List in 1932.
 
However, the area of this national heritage site has reduced from  due to farming activities in the region. So far, agricultural activities have damaged a large amount of historical evidence and resulted in the destruction of a large number of historical buildings.
Currently, farmers who have occupied the lands do not have title deeds. Also, since there was no supervision over these lands in the past few decades, a large area of this territory have been occupied and cultivated by local farmers.

References

Ancient Iranian cities
Archaeological sites in Iran
History of Ilam Province
Buildings and structures in Ilam Province